Heilman Glacier is a glacier in the northern part of the Queen Elizabeth Range in Antarctica, flowing northwest from Mount Sandved into Nimrod Glacier. It was mapped by the United States Geological Survey from tellurometer surveys and Navy air photos, 1960–62, and was named by the Advisory Committee on Antarctic Names for William L. Heilman, a United States Antarctic Research Program glaciologist at Roosevelt Island, 1961–62.

References

Glaciers of Shackleton Coast